Cerignola is a town and comune of Apulia, Italy, in the province of Foggia,  southeast from the town of Foggia. In 2017, it had a population of 58,534.

Geography
The large municipality is located in the Valley of Ofanto, a strip of land that runs alongside the homonymous river delimiting the southern edge of the Tavoliere Tavoliere. Cerignola is situated in south of the province of Foggia, and spans from the Salt Marshes of Margherita di Savoia to the borders with Basilicata region. It borders with Ascoli Satriano, Canosa di Puglia, Carapelle, Lavello, Manfredonia, Ordona, Orta Nova, San Ferdinando di Puglia, Stornara, Stornarella, Trinitapoli and Zapponeta.

Cerignola is the second biggest town of Capitanata for its number of inhabitants as well as for being the largest agriculture centre in its province.

History

Cerignola occupies the site of Furfane, a station on the ancient Roman Via Traiana between Canusium and Herdoniae.

It was a municipium during the Roman Empire. In the Middle Ages, as part of the Kingdom of Naples, in 1418 it became a fief of the Caracciolo family.

In 1503 the Spaniards under Gonzalo de Córdoba defeated the French under Louis d'Armagnac (6th Duke of Nemours) below the town, a victory which ensured Spain the rule over the kingdom of Naples (see battle of Cerignola) and is considered the first battle whose outcome was determined by gunpowder.

In 17th century the fief passed to the Pignatelli family. Cerignola was rebuilt after a great earthquake in 1731. In the 19th century, after the reclamation of its territory, it has been home to a considerable agricultural production.

Main sights
The Cathedral
The Chiesa Madre of St. Francis of Assisi (11th-12th centuries)
Torre Alemanna (13th century), in the frazione Borgo Libertà
Church of Beata Vergine del Monte Carmelo (16th century)
Palazzo Cirillo-Farrusi
Piano delle Fosse del Grano

Cuisine
 
The Italian wine DOC of Rosso di Cerignola is designated for red wine production only. Grapes are limited to a harvest yield of 14 tonnes/ha with the finished wine required to have at least 12% alcohol. The wine is a blend of at least 55% Uva di Troia, 15-30% Negroamaro, and up to 15% of an assortment of Sangiovese, Barbera, Montepulciano, Malbec and Trebbiano. If the wine is labeled as Riserva then the wine must have been aged at least two years in oak barrels/wood with a minimum alcohol level of 13%.

Transportation
Cerignola has a station, Cerignola Campagna, on the Pescara-Bari main railroad (Adriatic railway), served by regional trains. From 1891 to 1956, it was the terminus of a short line to the city centre (Cerignola Città station).

It has also an exit ("Cerignola Est") on the A14 motorway Bologna-Taranto, and one ("Cerignola Ovest") on the A16 motorway Naples-Canosa. Provincial roads connect it to the main centre in the region as well.

Public bus service in the town is provided by STUC company.

People

Cerignola is the native town of philologist Nicola Zingarelli, founder of the Zingarelli Italian dictionary, and syndicalist Giuseppe Di Vittorio.

Sport
The local football team is the Audace Cerignola, and its home ground is the Domenico Monterisi Stadium.

International relations

 
Cerignola is twinned with:
 Vizzini, Italy
 Montilla, Spain
 Nemours, France

See also
Roman Catholic Diocese of Cerignola-Ascoli Satriano

References

Sources

External links

Official website 
La Notizia Web - Cerignola's online newspaper 

 
Cities and towns in Apulia